The Ofayé or Opaye language, also Ofaié-Xavante, Opaié-Shavante, forms its own branch of the Macro-Jê languages. It is spoken by only a couple of the small Ofayé people, though language revitalization efforts are underway. Grammatical descriptions have been made by the Pankararú linguist Maria das Dores de Oliveira (Pankararu), as well as by Sarah C. Gudschinsky and Jennifer E. da Silva, from the Universidade Federal do Mato Grosso do Sul.

It was spoken on the Ivinhema River, Pardo River, and Nhandú River in Mato Grosso do Sul. Guachi, spoken on the Vacaria River in Mato Grosso do Sul, is a dialect.

Language contact
Jolkesky (2016) notes that there are lexical similarities with the Macro-Mataguayo-Guaykuru languages due to contact.

Phonology 
The consonantal inventory of Ofayé is as follows.

The vowel inventory of Ofayé is as follows.

Vocabulary
Loukotka (1968) lists the following basic vocabulary items.

{| class="wikitable"
! gloss !! Opaie
|-
| one || enex-há
|-
| two || yakwári
|-
| tongue || chü-õrá
|-
| foot || chü-gareyé
|-
| fire || mitáu
|-
| tree || komekatá
|-
| jaguar || woki
|-
| house || shüa
|-
| white || õká
|}

References

Nuclear Macro-Jê languages
Languages of Brazil
Indigenous languages of South America (Central)
Endangered indigenous languages of the Americas